Ostreina is a suborder of saltwater clams, marine bivalve molluscs in the order Ostreoida. It contains the superfamilies Dimyoidea, Ostreoidea and Plicatuloidea.

References

Bivalve taxonomy
Mollusc suborders